Hiware Korda is a village in Parner taluka in Ahmednagar district of state of Maharashtra, India.

Grampanchyat Hiware Korda Member
.The chairman of vividh karyakari seva society is Mr.Shri. Balasaheb Korde and Vice-chairman is Mr.Bhalchandr Chaudhari

Religion
The majority of the population in the village is Hindu and of Bhill ethnicity. There is also a Muslim community Hiware Korda, and Mahar caste communities.

Economy
The majority of the population is involved in farming as a primary occupation.
The village is known for a famous temple, the Malganga Mata mandir. Also present is an old Shiv mandir.
A 150-200 year old and famous Majjid is present in the village, and also the famous Sayyad Shah Vali baba dargah present in the village.

See also
 Parner taluka
 Villages in Parner taluka
  Hiware Korda Grampanchayat

References 

Villages in Parner taluka
Villages in Ahmednagar district